A volvelle or wheel chart is a type of slide chart, a paper construction with rotating parts. It is considered an early example of a paper analog computer. Volvelles have been produced to accommodate organization and calculation in many diverse subjects. Early examples of volvelles are found in the pages of astronomy books. They can be traced back to "certain Arabic treatises on humoral medicine" and to the Persian astronomer, Abu Rayhan Biruni (c. 1000), who made important contributions to the development of the volvelle.

In the twentieth century, the volvelle had many diverse uses. In Reinventing the Wheel, author Jessica Helfand introduces twentieth-century volvelles with this:

The rock band Led Zeppelin employed a volvelle in the sleeve design for the album Led Zeppelin III (1970).

Two games from the game company Infocom included volvelles inside their package as "feelies": Sorcerer (1983) and A Mind Forever Voyaging (1985). Both volvelles served to impede copying of the games, because they contained information needed to play the game.

See also

 E6B
 Ramon Llull
 Pop-up book
 Slide chart
 Zairja

References

Further reading
 Eye, No. 41, Vol. 11, edited by John L. Walters, Quantum Publishing, Autumn 2001.
 Lindberg, Sten G. "Mobiles in Books: Volvelles, Inserts, Pyramids, Divinations, and Children's Games". The Private Library, 3rd series 2.2 (1979): 49.
  An exhibition of volvelles at New York's Grolier Club.

Analog computers
Astronomical instruments
Communication design
Graphic design